Partick is an area in Glasgow.

Partick may also refer to:

 Partick (UK Parliament constituency)
 Partick station
 Partick F.C. (1875), a historical football club
 Glasgow Partick (UK Parliament constituency)

See also 
 Partick Thistle F.C., professional footbal club
 Partick Thistle W.F.C., women's footbal club
 Partick Castle
 Partick Central railway station
 Patrick (disambiguation)